Kimberley Davies (born 20 February 1973) is an Australian actress most famous for playing Annalise Hartman on the Australian soap opera Neighbours from 1993 to 1996. She is sometimes credited as "Kimberly Davies".

Life and career
Davies was born in Ballarat, Victoria. In 1996, she hosted an Australian series called Just Kidding!, which featured pranks played on an unsuspecting public.

Davies later moved to the United States and played the role of Laura Sinclair in the lavish but short-lived night-time soap opera Pacific Palisades. She also made guest appearances on Ally McBeal, Early Edition and Friends, and appeared in the films Psycho Beach Party, The Next Best Thing, The Shrink Is In, Made and South Pacific.  In 2005, she returned to Neighbours for the show's twentieth anniversary.

In May 2005, she appeared on an Australian reality television show called Celebrity Circus and in November 2005 she appeared in the fifth series of UK reality television show I'm a Celebrity... Get Me Out of Here! but left halfway through after she hurt her shoulder, during one of the "Bush Tucker Trials". In 2007, Davies was a contestant on Australia's Dancing with the Stars and in the summer of that year she appeared in a Daz advert in the UK.

Davies also played Alura McCall in the James Bond videogame James Bond 007: Nightfire.

She appeared in the 2009 Christmas Special of Australian comedy game show Talkin' 'Bout Your Generation.

Personal life 
She is married to model-turned-doctor Jason Harvey. They have three children: Isabella, Josh and Ashton.

References

External links

Unreality TV – News of Kimberley Davies on I'm a Celebrity

1973 births
Australian soap opera actresses
People from Ballarat
Living people
Australian emigrants to the United States
I'm a Celebrity...Get Me Out of Here! (British TV series) participants